Limpopo is the northernmost province of South Africa. It is named after the Limpopo River, which forms the province's western and northern borders. The capital and largest city in the province is Polokwane, while the provincial legislature is situated in Lebowakgomo. 

The province is made up of three former homelands of Lebowa, Gazankulu and Venda and the former parts of the Transvaal province. The Limpopo province was established as one of the new nine provinces after South Africa's first democratic election on 27 April 1994. The province's name was first "Northern Transvaal", later changed to "Northern Province" on 28 June 1995, together with two other provinces. The name was later changed again in 2002 to the Limpopo province. Limpopo is made up of three main ethnic groups namely; Pedi people, Tsonga and Venda people.

Traditional leaders and chiefs still form a strong backbone of the province's political landscape. Established in terms of the Limpopo House of Traditional Leaders Act, Act 5 of 2005, the Limpopo House of Traditional Leaders' main function is to advise government and the legislature on matters related to custom, tradition and culture including developmental initiatives that affect rural communities. On 18 August 2017 Kgosi Malesela Dikgale was re-elected as the Chairperson of the Limpopo House of Traditional Leaders.

Geography

Limpopo Province shares international borders with districts and provinces of three countries: Botswana's Central and Kgatleng districts to the west and northwest respectively, Zimbabwe's Matabeleland South and Masvingo provinces to the north and northeast respectively, and Mozambique's Gaza Province to the east. Limpopo is the link between South Africa and countries further afield in sub-Saharan Africa. On its southern edge, from east to west, it shares borders with the South African provinces of Mpumalanga, Gauteng, and North West. Its border with Gauteng includes that province's Johannesburg-Pretoria axis, the most industrialised metropolis on the continent. The province is at the centre of regional, national, and international developing markets.

Law and government

The current Premier of Limpopo Province is Stanley Mathabatha, representing the African National Congress.

Municipalities

Limpopo Province is divided into five district municipalities. The district municipalities are in turn divided into 25 local municipalities:

District municipalities

Capricorn District
Blouberg
Lepele-Nkumpi
Molemole
Polokwane
Mopani District
Ba-Phalaborwa
Greater Giyani
Greater Letaba
Greater Tzaneen
Maruleng
Sekhukhune District
Elias Motsoaledi
Ephraim Mogale
Fetakgomo Tubatse
Makhuduthamaga
Vhembe District
Makhado
Musina
Collins Chabane
Thulamela
Waterberg District
Bela-Bela
Lephalale
Modimolle–Mookgophong
Mogalakwena
Thabazimbi

Economy

Limpopo has a total population of 6.015 Million with 1.641million Households.,  The province has a high Human Development Index (HDI) of 0.710, which is the third highest in South Africa.

Agriculture
The bushveld is beef cattle country, where extensive ranching operations are often supplemented by controlled hunting. About 80% of South Africa's game hunting industry is found in Limpopo.
 
Sunflowers, cotton, maize and peanuts are cultivated in the Bela-Bela and Modimolle areas. Modimolle is also known for its table grapes. There is an embryotic wine industry growing in Limpopo. Tropical fruit, such as bananas, litchis, pineapples, mangoes and pawpaws, as well as a variety of nuts, are grown in the Tzaneen and Louis Trichardt areas. Tzaneen is also at the centre of extensive citrus, tea and coffee plantations, and a major forestry industry. Most of the farmers and house holds suffer from water supply, therefore they drill their boreholes in their premises.

Housing
Majority of Limpopo residents live in rural areas, this has given rise to a new phenomenon of rural development, where the residents have invested in building lavish homes on their tribal land. Limpopo rural houses have been profiled by TV channels, lifestyle vloggers, social media influencers, and Africa's biggest facts brand Africa Facts Zone. According to  96.2% of Limpopo lives in formal housing, this figure is above the national average of 84.0%. This makes Limpopo the province with the highest percentage of people living in formal housing in South Africa.

Mining

Limpopo's rich mineral deposits include the platinum group metals, iron ore, chromium, high- and middle-grade coking coal, diamonds, antimony, phosphate, and copper, as well as mineral reserves like gold, emeralds, scheelite, magnetite, vermiculite, silicon, and mica. Commodities such as black granite, corundum, and feldspar are also found. Mining contributes to over a fifth of the provincial economy.

Limpopo has the largest platinum deposit in South Africa. The Waterberg Coalfield, the eastern extension of Botswana's Mmamabula coalfields, is estimated to contain 40% of South Africa's coal reserves.

Tourism
The Limpopo Department of Economic Development, Environment and Tourism has targeted the province as a preferred eco-tourism destination. Its Environment and Tourism Programme encompasses tourism, protected areas and community environment development to achieve sustainable economic growth.

While Limpopo is one of South Africa's poorest provinces, it is rich in wildlife, which gives it an advantage in attracting tourists. Both the private and public sectors are investing in tourism development.

Near Modjadjiskloof, at Sunland Baobab farms, there is a large Baobab tree which has been fashioned into a rather spacious pub.

Transportation and communications
The province has excellent road, rail, and air links. The N1 route from Johannesburg, which extends the length of the province, is the busiest overland route in Africa in terms of cross-border trade in raw materials and beneficiated goods. The port of Durban, South Africa's busiest, is served directly  by the province, as are the ports of Richards Bay and Maputo. Polokwane International Airport is situated just north of Polokwane. Limpopo province contains approximately 56 airports and airstrips.

Education
The Department of Education is charged with the responsibility of effecting quality education and training for all. The Department has to coordinate all professional development and support. Policies, systems, and procedures had to be developed.

Educational institutions
As of December 2020, 12.9% of Limpopo population had attained some post-school qualifications. The following higher education institutions are found in Limpopo: 
University of Limpopo (Polokwane, Mankweng)
University of Venda (Thohoyandou)
Tshwane University of Technology (Polokwane Campus)
Capricorn College for TVET (Seshego)
 Capricorn College for TVET (Polokwane)
 Lephalale TVET College (Lephalale)
 Letaba TVET College (Tzaneen)
 Mopani South East TVET College (Phalaborwa)
 Sekhukhune TVET College (Motetema)
Vhembe TVET College (Venda)
 Waterberg TVET College (Mokopane)
Giyani Campus Of Nursing College 
Limpopo Province College of Nursing (Giyani Campus)

Sports
Association football: Polokwane was one of South Africa's host cities for the 2010 FIFA World Cup, with matches being played at the Peter Mokaba Stadium. Football clubs in the province include Real Rovers, Silver Stars, Black Leopards, Polokwane City, Baroka, Ria Stars, and Dynamos.
Rugby union: Limpopo has no provincial rugby team of its own; it is represented in the domestic Currie Cup by the Pretoria-based Blue Bulls. The Blue Bulls also operate a Super Rugby franchise, known simply as the Bulls. Limpopo nonetheless produces its share of top players. Most notably, the two most-capped forwards in the history of the country's national team, John Smit and Victor Matfield, are both natives of Polokwane.
Basketball: The province is home to Limpopo Pride, a professional team that plays in South Africa's top basketball division, the Basketball National League.

Demographics

The population of Limpopo consists of several ethnic groups distinguished by culture, language and race. 97.3% of the population is Black, 2.4% is White, 0.2% is Coloured, and 0.1% is Indian/Asian. The province has the smallest percentage and second smallest total number of White South Africans in the country; although there a number of localities with a White majority, notably Hoedspruit and Modimolle. It also has the highest Black percentage out of all the provinces.

The Northern Sotho people make up the largest percentage of the population, making 52% of the province. The Tsonga people comprise about 24.0% of the province; the Tsonga also comprise about 11.5% of Mpumalanga province since the southern part of their homeland, Gazankulu, was cut off from Limpopo and allocated to Mpumalanga. The Venda make up about 16.7%. Afrikaners make up the majority of Limpopo's White population, about 95,000 people; English-speaking Whites number just over 20,000. Vhembe district has the smallest share of White people in Limpopo, about 5,000 total, while the Waterberg district has the largest share of Whites, with more than 60,000 Whites residing there. Coloureds and Asians/Indians make up a very small percentage of the province's total population.

HIV / AIDS

At 18.5% (2007), Limpopo has a fairly high incidence of HIV compared to other South African provinces. Cases rose from 14.5% to 21.5% between 2001 and 2005, with a slight fall between 2005 and 2007. However, as at 2019, the Limpopo province HIV stats sat at (13.2%)  which is one of the lowest in comparison with other provinces in South Africa.

See also
List of cities and towns in Limpopo
Limpopo River
Xibelani dance
Zoutpansberg division

References

External links

 Limpopo Provincial Government
 Limpopo Tourism Agency

 
Provinces of South Africa
States and territories established in 1994
1994 establishments in South Africa